Dippitiya is a village in Sri Lanka. It is located within Sabaragamuwa Province.

External links

Populated places in Central Province, Sri Lanka